Välkommen jul is a 2011 Jill Johnson Christmas album, recorded by her together with the Gävle Symphony Orchestra. The album was sold in the ICA stores of Sweden to bring money for the World Childhood Foundation.

Track listing

References 

2011 Christmas albums
Charity albums
Christmas albums by Swedish artists
Country Christmas albums
Jill Johnson albums